Lilian Williams (9 June 1895 – 14 August 1969) was a British equestrian. She competed at the 1956 Summer Olympics and the 1960 Summer Olympics.

References

1895 births
1969 deaths
British female equestrians
British dressage riders
Olympic equestrians of Great Britain
Equestrians at the 1956 Summer Olympics
Equestrians at the 1960 Summer Olympics